William Henry Sproul (October 14, 1867 – December 27, 1932) was a U.S. Representative from Kansas.

Born on a farm near Livingston, Tennessee, Sproul attended the public schools and Alpine Academy in Overton County, Tennessee. In 1883 moved to Kansas with his parents, who settled in Cherokee County. He worked on a farm and in the mines. He attended high school at Columbus, Kansas, and the Kansas Normal College at Fort Scott. He taught school at Columbus 1888–1892. He was graduated from the Kansas State University Law School in 1894. He was admitted to the bar in 1894 and commenced practice in Sedan, Kansas. He served as prosecuting attorney of Chautauqua County 1897–1901. He served as mayor of Sedan 1921–1923. He engaged in agricultural pursuits and stock raising. He was also interested in the oil and gas business.

Sproul was elected as a Republican to the Sixty-eighth and to the three succeeding Congresses (March 4, 1923 – March 3, 1931). He served as chairman of the Committee on Mines and Mining (Seventy-first Congress). He was not a candidate for renomination, but was an unsuccessful candidate for nomination for United States Senator in 1930. He resumed his former business pursuits. He died in a hospital in Kansas City, Missouri, December 27, 1932. He was interred in Greenwood Cemetery, Sedan, Kansas.

References

1867 births
1932 deaths
People from Sedan, Kansas
Republican Party members of the United States House of Representatives from Kansas
People from Livingston, Tennessee
Mayors of places in Kansas